The Port of Pyeongtaek-Dangjin is a port in South Korea, located in the cities of Pyeongtaek and Dangjin.

References

Pyeongtaek-Dangjin
Internal territorial disputes of South Korea